Hywel Davies may refer to:

 Hywel Davies (broadcaster) (1919–1965), Welsh radio broadcaster and television interviewer
 Hywel Davies (doctor) (1924–2016) cardiologist and writer
 Hywel Davies (journalist), British fashion writer
 Hywel Davies (rugby league) (born 1981), Welsh rugby league footballer and coach
 Hywel Islwyn Davies (priest) (1909–1981), Dean of Bangor
 Hywel Davies (jockey) (born 1957), Welsh jockey
 Hywel Davies (footballer) (1902–1976), Welsh international footballer

See also
 Howel Davies (Methodist minister) (1716–1770), Welsh Methodist minister